The Happy Hocky Family Moves to the Country! is a book by Lane Smith.  A sequel to his book The Happy Hocky Family!, it tells a number of very short stories about the Hocky family and their new home in the country.

It was published in 2003 by Puffin Books.

See also

The Happy Hocky Family!

Lane Smith (illustrator)

References

External links
Lane Smith's website

American picture books
Children's short story collections

2003 children's books